New Hampshire Route 155 is an  secondary north–south highway in southeastern New Hampshire, almost entirely within Strafford County. The highway runs from New Hampshire Route 125 in Epping to New Hampshire Route 9 in Dover.

A secondary loop of NH 155 runs into Durham, designated as New Hampshire Route 155A (see below).

Route description 
The southern terminus of NH 155 is in Epping at the junction with NH 125 (Calef Highway). Just  to the north, the highway crosses the county line into Strafford County and the town of Lee, crossing NH 152 along the way. NH 155 travels through the center of Lee. A few miles later NH 155A splits off eastward into Durham while NH 155 turns northward towards Dover. Continuing north, NH 155 meets U.S. Route 4 at a half-diamond interchange, limiting access to two movements: US 4 eastbound to NH 155 and NH 155 to US 4 westbound. Access to US 4 eastbound is facilitated by nearby NH 155A, which rejoins its parent and runs east (signed south) to its own interchange with US 4. NH 155 continues north along the western edge of Durham and the eastern part of Madbury before crossing into the city of Dover. The roadway continues as NH 9 eastbound towards downtown Dover.

Major intersections

Suffixed routes

New Hampshire Route 155A

New Hampshire Route 155A is a three-quarter loop of NH 155, running  in the towns of Lee and Durham.  It functions as a full-access point to US 4, as NH 155 intersects US 4 at a partial interchange.  It is also the preferred method of accessing the University of New Hampshire Durham campus from US 4.

The southern terminus of NH 155A is in Lee at the intersection of Mast Road and Turtle Pond Road.  NH 155 turns northward towards Madbury while NH 155A continues northeast on Mast Road and crosses into Durham.  NH 155A runs into the western part of the UNH campus until reaching Main Street.  The highway turns left on Main Street heading away from the center of campus and interchanges with US 4.  NH 155A continues west, crosses back into Lee, and ends at NH 155 near the US 4 interchange.

The northern section of NH 155A in Lee is named Sherburne Road (formerly the Old Concord Turnpike).

References

External links

 New Hampshire State Route 155 on Flickr
 New Hampshire State Route 155A on Flickr

155
Transportation in Rockingham County, New Hampshire
Transportation in Strafford County, New Hampshire